An Electromagnetic Log, sometimes called an "EM Log", measures the speed of a vessel through water.

It operates on the principle that:
1 when a conductor (such as water) passes through an electromagnetic field, a voltage is created and
2 the amount of voltage created increases as the speed of the conductor increases.

The process is
 the EM Log creates an electromagnetic field
 a voltage is induced in the water; the magnitude of the voltage varies depending upon the speed of the water flow past the sensor
 the EM Log measures the voltage created and translates this into the vessel's speed through water

Advantages 
 No moving parts
 Less affected by sea growth than Pit sword

Disadvantages
 Salinity and temperature of water affects calibration
 Measurements affected by boundary layer, (water speed slowed down close to the hull by friction)
 Provides boat/ship speed relative to water not ground
 Current affects accuracy

See also

 Pit sword

External links 

 http://thenauticalsite.com/NauticalNotes/EchoSpdLog/MyEchoSpdLog-Lesson02-SpeedLogs.htm

Navigational equipment
Speed sensors